Glad All Over is the American debut studio album of the English rock band the Dave Clark Five. Epic Records released the album in March 1964 in the United States to capitalize on the success of the album's title track, and despite the caption saying "Featuring Bits and Pieces", the single did not become a hit until two months later. The album contains some of their hit songs like "Glad All Over", "Bits and Pieces" and "Do You Love Me". In Canada, it was released as Bits and Pieces on Capitol Records.

Reception

In his AllMusic retrospective review of the release, Richie Unterberger wrote, "The Dave Clark Five's first album might seem a bit on the meager side outside of the context of the first flush of the British Invasion. At the time, though, it was a pretty exuberant slab o' vinyl that rocked pretty hard for the most part, paced by the three Top 10 singles 'Glad All Over,' 'Do You Love Me,' and 'Bits and Pieces.' And it does have a few decent, though not great, original songs that don't show up on greatest hits compilations: the solid pop/rocker 'I Know You,' the raucous 'Twist and Shout' rip-off 'No Time to Lose,' and the surprisingly savage instrumental 'Chaquita,' an inversion of 'Tequila' with its snaky, growling guitar riffs and dirty sax. There's also some pure filler, like the jazzy instrumental 'Time' and the infantile 'Doo Dah.' It certainly ranks among their best non-greatest-hits albums, which isn't as high a recommendation as it sounds, since the group's LPs weren't that good overall."

Track listing

Personnel
The Dave Clark Five
 Dave Clark – drums, backing vocals
 Mike Smith – organ, piano, lead vocals
 Lenny Davidson – guitars, backing vocals
 Rick Huxley – bass guitar, harmonica, backing vocals
 Denis Payton – saxophone, backing vocals
 Bobby Graham - drums

References

The Dave Clark Five albums
1964 debut albums
EMI Columbia Records albums
Epic Records albums